Elisa Mújica Velásquez (21 January, 1918 – 27 March, 2003) was a Colombian writer. She published novels, short stories, essays, books for children as well as interviews, book reviews and columns for local newspapers El Tiempo and El Espectador. She was a member of the Academia Colombiana de la Lengua and the Real Academia Española. In 2018 the award Premio Nacional de Narrativa Elisa Mújica was created in order to recognize the work of unpublished female authors and to honor her 100th birth anniversary.

Career
She worked as an assistant at the Ministry of Communications. Later, between 1936 and 1943, she worked as the personal secretary of future President of Colombia Carlos Lleras Restrepo. During these days, she was close to the Grupo Bachué, one of the most important artistic avant-garde movements in Colombia. Later, she worked at the Quito Embassy between 1943 and 1945. She published her novel Los dos tiempos in 1949. She lived in Spain in the 1950s and was an influence to her niece, the poet and journalist María Mercedes Carranza. In Ecuador she had met members from El grupo de Guayaquil and become a supporter of marxism and communism. However, she was also interested in figures such as Sor Teresa de Jesús and Sor Francisca Josefa del Castillo. In 1964 she wrote the essay La aventura demorada. Ensayo sobre santa Teresa de Jesús. She also received a special recognition by the Premio Esso for her novel Catalina in 1962. In the 1980s, Mújica was a member of the Academia Colombiana de la Lengua and the Real Academia Española.

Published works

Novels
 Los dos tiempos, 1949
 Catalina, 1963
 Bogotá de las nubes, 1984

Essays
 El Indio en América: síntesis de obras americanas sobre el problema indígena, 1948
 La aventura demorada: ensayo sobre santa Teresa de Jesús, 1951
 La Candelaria, 1974
 Introducción a Santa Teresa, 1981
 Las altas torres del humo: raíces del cuento popular en Colombia, 1985
 Sor Francisca Josefa de Castillo, 1991

Short stories
 Ángela y el diablo, 1953
 Árbol de ruedas, 1972
 "Prólogo"; "La Montaña"; "Las reclusas"; "La biblioteca"; "La acacia"; "El visitante"; "El espejo y el rubí"; "El aeropuerto"; "La palmera"; "La perla"; "El documento"; "La silla giratoria"; "El retrato"
 La tienda de las imágenes, 1987
 Cuentos, 2009

Children's literature
 La Expedición Botánica contada a los niños, 1978
 Bestiario, 1980
 Pequeño Bestiario, 1990
 Las casas que hablan: guía histórica del barrio de la Candelaria de Santa Fé de Bogotá, 1994
 Cuentos para niños de La Candelaria, 1997

Autobiography
 Diario: 1968–1971, 2008

Criticism
 Reminiscencias de Santafé de Bogotá, de José María Cordovez Moure, Aguilar, 1957

Awards and recognition
 "Tribute of admiration" from the jury of the 1962 Esso Literature Prize, for her novel Catalina

References

External links
 Review of the novel Catalina at UNESCO Portal 

1918 births
2003 deaths
20th-century Colombian poets
21st-century Colombian poets
Colombian women poets
Members of the Royal Spanish Academy
People from Bucaramanga
20th-century Colombian women writers
21st-century Colombian women writers